Porteous, Mitchell & Braun Co., or simply Porteous, was a mid-market department store based in Portland, Maine.

Flagship store
At the time the store was opened in 1904 it was the largest department store based in Maine. It became the flagship location and headquarters of Porteous, located on Congress Street in downtown Portland. After the company closed the store at this location, it was used for warehouse sales. Today the flagship location has been restored and is home to Maine College of Art.

Expanded locations
Porteous expanded and opened branch locations in Maine, New Hampshire, and Vermont.  The first branch took over another store that had ceased operations.  In Newington NH, Porteous opened in the Newington Mall (now The Crossings at Fox Run) in a location formerly occupied by Sutherland's, the only branch store of a Lawrence MA-based department store that ceased operations in 1976. Other Porteous branches were opened in new shopping malls that opened in the late 1970s and early 1980s including the Auburn Mall in Auburn, ME (1979), Bangor Mall in Bangor, ME (1978), Burlington Square Mall (now Burlington Town Center) in Downtown Burlington, VT and the Aroostook Centre Mall in Presque Isle, ME (1993).  The former W.T. Grant store in Cooks Corner Shopping Center in Brunswick ME had been taken over by JC Penney, but was subsequently closed when the JC Penney store opened at the expanded Maine Mall in South Portland in 1983.  Porteous not only opened in The Maine Mall at this time but also took over the Cooks Corner location. The downtown Portland flagship store closed not long after the Maine Mall store opened.

Decline and shutdown
Owned by the Dunlaps Store chain based in Texas in its last years (starting around 1993), and operated as "PMB, Inc.--a Division of Dunlaps", the chain found itself flustered with new competition as many regional and national chains started to open units in Maine, New Hampshire and Vermont communities where Porteous previously had carved out its niche in the mid-market department store business. The chain started to shut down in the mid-1990s, closing its Newington NH, and South Portland ME stores, and was completely shuttered by 2003 when its last store in Presque Isle closed.

References

Defunct department stores based in Maine
Retail companies disestablished in 2003
Retail companies established in 1904